Tiosa is an unincorporated community in Richland Township, Fulton County, Indiana.

Geography

History
Tiosa was established in about 1869. The community was named in honor of a Potawatomi chief. A post office was established at Tiosa in 1872, and remained in operation until it was discontinued in 1932.

References

Unincorporated communities in Fulton County, Indiana
Unincorporated communities in Indiana